The Moju dos Campos River is a river in the western part of the state of Pará, Brazil.

The Moju River, a tributary of the Curuá Una River, rises in the Tapajós National Forest, a  sustainable use conservation unit created in 1974, and flows eastward.

See also
List of rivers of Pará

References

Rivers of Pará